Andrei Yurevich Tolubeyev (March 30, 1945 – April 7, 2008) was a Soviet and Russian theatrical and cinema actor. People's Artist of the RSFSR (1991). Chairman of the Board of the Union of Theatrical Figures of Russia (1996). He was born in Leningrad, Soviet Union and died of pancreatic cancer in St. Petersburg, Russia.

His father was a famous actor Yuri Tolubeyev.

Selected filmography
1982 — Tears Were Falling
1989 — To Kill a Dragon
1991 — My Best Friend, General Vasili, Son of Joseph Stalin
1994 — The Flood
2000 / 2003 — Bandit Petersburg
2000 — Empire under Attack
 2001 — Deadly Force
 2005 — Yesenin
2006 — Dobrinya and the Dragon (voice)
 2008 — The Admiral

References

External links 

 Personal website of Andrei Tolubeyev 

1945 births
2008 deaths
People's Artists of the RSFSR
Deaths from cancer in Russia
Deaths from pancreatic cancer
Male actors from Saint Petersburg
Soviet male  stage actors
Soviet male film actors
Russian male  stage actors
Russian male film actors
Russian male television actors
Russian male voice actors
Honored Artists of the RSFSR
S.M. Kirov Military Medical Academy alumni
State Prize of the Russian Federation laureates